Intrex Trade Exchange Ltd is India's first ever Cash Trade Exchange, based in Mumbai, Maharashtra. formerly known as Intrex India Ltd, is a public limited company incorporated in Year 2000 by Essel Group. The Trade exchange, comprising both a cash and a cashless exchange, offers Indian businesses an integrated platform for their finance, marketing and sourcing requirements.

References

Stock exchanges in India
Financial services companies based in Mumbai
Financial services companies established in 2000
Essel Group
2000 establishments in Maharashtra
Indian companies established in 2000